Mary Sawyer (born 11 June 1957) is a former professional tennis player from Australia.

Biography
Sawyer comes from Perth and is of Irish descent, with her father an immigrant from Ireland. A two-time winner of the Irish Open, Sawyer beat former Wimbledon and US Open champion Maria Bueno in the 1977 final, then won the event again the following year.

Her most notable performance was a semifinal appearance at the 1979 Australian Open. Previously twice a quarterfinalist, she began the tournament with a first round upset over top-seeded Virginia Ruzici. This was the first occasion that a number one seed had been beaten in the opening round of the women's singles at a Grand Slam. She then defeated Naoko Sato and seventh-seeded Janet Newberry, then lost in the semifinals to Sharon Walsh.

After the Australia Open, Sawyer took a break from tennis, which she had planned before her tournament run. She had announced that she wanted to spend more time at home in Perth, having only been there for three-months out of the last five years. The break turned out to be permanent as she never returned to the tour.

WTA Tour finals

Doubles (0–1)

References

External links
 
 

1957 births
Living people
Australian female tennis players
Tennis players from Perth, Western Australia
Australian people of Irish descent